The following lists events that happened during 1904 in Australia.

Incumbents

Monarch – Edward VII
Governor-General – Hallam Tennyson, 2nd Baron Tennyson (until 21 January), then Henry Northcote, 1st Baron Northcote
Prime Minister – Alfred Deakin (until 27 April), Chris Watson (until 18 August), then George Reid
Chief Justice – Samuel Griffith

State premiers
Premier of New South Wales – John See (until 14 June), Thomas Waddell (until 29 August), then Joseph Carruthers
Premier of South Australia – John Jenkins
Premier of Queensland – Arthur Morgan
Premier of Tasmania – William Propsting (until 12 July), then John Evans
Premier of Western Australia – Walter James (until 10 August), then Henry Daglish
Premier of Victoria – William Irvine (until 16 February), then Sir Thomas Bent

State governors
Governor of New South Wales – Sir Harry Rawson
Governor of South Australia – Sir George Ruthven Le Hunte
Governor of Queensland – Sir Herbert Chermside (until 10 October)
Governor of Tasmania – Captain Sir Arthur Havelock (until 16 April), then Sir Gerald Strickland (from 28 October)
Governor of Western Australia – Admiral Sir Frederick Bedford
Governor of Victoria – Major General Sir Reginald Talbot (from 25 April)

Events
 6 January – The Tasmanian government replaces the state's Central Board of Health with a Public Health Department.
 13 January – The flag of South Australia is officially gazetted as the current design.
 23 January – A by-election is held for the New South Wales Legislative Assembly seat of Ryde. It is won by Edward Terry for the Liberal Reform Party.
 29 February – Women's suffrage is granted in Tasmania.
 1 June – A general election is held in Victoria. Incumbent premier Sir Thomas Bent is returned with an increased majority.
 20 June – The P&O ship SS Australia is wrecked at the entrance to Port Phillip. There is no loss of life.
 12 November – John Drayton is imprisoned under parliamentary privilege provisions in Western Australia.
 1 December – Ipswich, Queensland is proclaimed as a city.

Arts and literature

 12 January – Melbourne businessman Alfred Felton leaves a large bequest to the Art Gallery of Victoria.
 Hans Heysen wins the Wynne Prize with Mystic Morn
 The Austral Hall Toowoomba was officially opened on 5 November 1904 by Sir Hugh Nelson, Lieutenant Governor of Queensland for The Austral Society.

Sport
 September – The Australasian Lawn Tennis Association is formed in Sydney.
 1 November – Acrasia wins the Melbourne Cup.
 New South Wales wins the Sheffield Shield.
 Two Australians, Corrie Gardner and Leslie McPherson, compete in athletics at the 1904 Summer Olympics. They do not return with any medals

Births

 7 April – Sir Roland Wilson, public servant and economist (d. 1996)
 8 April – John Antill, composer (d. 1986)
 29 May – Sir Hubert Opperman, Victorian politician and cyclist (d. 1996)

Deaths

 8 January – Alfred Felton, entrepreneur, art collector and philanthropist (born in the United Kingdom) (b. 1831)
 25 January – Sir Graham Berry, 11th Premier of Victoria (born in the United Kingdom) (b. 1822)
 2 February – Sir Edward Braddon, 18th Premier of Tasmania (born in the United Kingdom) (b. 1829)
 12 April – George Cruickshank, New South Wales politician (b. 1853)
 12 May – Robert Reid, Victorian politician (born and died in the United Kingdom) (b. 1842)
 5 August – Sir George Dibbs, 10th Premier of New South Wales (b. 1834)
 17 December – William Shiels, 16th Premier of Victoria (born in Ireland) (b. 1848)

See also
1904
1900–1909

References

 
Years of the 20th century in Australia